Waking Up is a solo album by Topper Headon best known as the drummer of The Clash. The album was released by Mercury in 1986 with a cover photograph taken by Tim White. "Leave It to Luck" was released as a single and as part of an EP. The album was dedicated to the memory of Pete Farndon.

Track listing
All tracks composed and arranged by Topper Headon, except where indicated.
 "Leave It to Luck"
 "I'll Give You Everything"
 "Hope for Donna"
 "Got to Keep on Going"
 "Dancing"
 "Pleasure and Pain"
 "When You're Down"
 "Time Is Tight" (Booker T. Jones, Steve Cropper, Donald "Duck" Dunn, Al Jackson Jr.)
 "Just Another Hit"
 "Monkey on My Back"

Personnel
Topper Headon - drums, percussion
Martin Dobson - saxophone
Mick Gallagher - keyboards
Mark Graham - trombone
Tom Harris - saxophone
Jimmy Helms - vocals
Jerome Rimson - bass, vocals
Bob Tench - guitar, vocals
Geoffrey Miller - trumpet, flugelhorn

Notes 

1986 debut albums
Mercury Records albums